Oregon Ballot Measure 114, the Changes to Firearm Ownership and Purchase Requirements Initiative, is an Oregon state initiative that was approved by voters on November 8, 2022. It changes gun laws in Oregon to require a permit to purchase or acquire a firearm, and to ban the sale, transfer, and importation of magazines that "are capable of holding" more than ten rounds of ammunition. There have been a number of legal challenges to these provisions, and several judicial rulings have blocked the implementation of Ballot Measure 114, so the new laws are currently not in effect.

Description  
The permit (of a maximum amount of $65) must be purchased from either the county sheriff or police where the buyer resides. Permits are issued per person, not per gun, and are valid for five years. Law enforcement will have the ability to deny a permit to those they believe to be a danger to themselves or others, while those denied a permit are able to appeal in court. 

The permit to purchase law is similar to the permit requirements in 14 other states and Washington D.C. To obtain a permit to purchase a firearm, the applicant would be required to take a gun safety education class, submit their fingerprints, and pass a completed background check.  

The high-capacity magazine ban would prohibit residents from acquiring magazines that can hold more than ten rounds, as well as implementing a ban on any magazine "that can be readily restored, changed, or converted to accept, more than 10 rounds of ammunition". Existing magazines that can hold more than ten rounds would be grandfathered in, but could only be used on private property, i.e. not for concealed or open carry in public. Nine other states plus D.C. ban or restrict high-capacity magazines.

Implementation, enforcement, and effects 
Sheriffs in Klamath County, Linn County, Sherman County, and Union County declared their refusal to enforce some or all of the new laws, and gun rights organizations immediately prepared to challenge the constitutionality of the laws in court.

On December 6, 2022, Harney County Circuit Judge Robert S. Raschio issued a temporary restraining order against all provisions of the law (which the Oregon Supreme Court denied the attorney general's petition to overturn), a decision that came just hours after that of Federal Judge Karin Immergut allowing it to take effect, save for the permit requirement which was delayed for 30 days at the request of the state.

The passage of 114 saw a surge in gun sales. The Oregon State Police reported that prior the vote on 114, their Firearms Instant Check System (FICS) averaged 849 background checks a day in 2022. After 114's approval, the average number of background checks per day increased to 4,092.

Polling 
The following polls measured support or opposition among likely voters before the November elections.

See also 
 Gun laws in Oregon
 List of Oregon ballot measures

References

External links 
Text of Oregon Ballot Measure 114, Oregon Secretary of State website

2022 Oregon ballot measures
United States firearms law